Germany is the third largest music market in the world, and the largest in Europe. This is a list of the best-selling albums in Germany that have been certified by the Bundesverband Musikindustrie (BVMI). Since January 1, 2003, BVMI certifies an album platinum for the shipment of 200,000 copies across Germany.

All albums in this list must have sold more than a million copies.

Certifications for albums released in Germany depend upon their release date.

Certification levels

Source:

By units

 Tracy Chapman's eponymous debut album was certified 9× Gold in 2010. Since this album was released prior to September 24, 1999, every Gold certification it receives denotes 250,000 copies shipped. Thus at 9× Gold, 2.25 million copies of the album have been shipped across Germany.
 1 by The Beatles was certified 11× Gold in 2007. Since this album was released prior to January 1, 2003, every Gold certification it receives denotes 150,000 copies shipped. Thus at 11× Gold, 1.65 million copies of the album have been shipped across Germany.

Notes

See also
List of best-selling singles in Germany

References

Germany
Best-selling albums